Tea for Two was a 10" LP album released by Columbia Records on  September 4, 1950. It was released under catalog number CL-6149, featuring Doris Day, with Axel Stordahl conducting the orchestra on some pieces, and the Page Cavanaugh Trio as backup musicians on others. It contained songs from the soundtrack of the movie of the same name.

Track listing
"Crazy Rhythm" (Joseph Meyer, Roger Wolfe Kahn, Irving Caesar) (duet with Gene Nelson & The Page Cavanaugh Trio) (recorded July 25, 1950) - 2:24
"Here in My Arms" (Richard Rodgers, Lorenz Hart) (with Axel Stordahl's orchestra) (recorded July 14, 1950) - 3:04
"I Know That You Know" (Vincent Youmans, Anne Caldwell) (duet with Gene Nelson & The Page Cavanaugh Trio) (recorded July 25, 1950) - 2:47
"I Want to Be Happy" (Vincent Youmans, Irving Caesar) (with The Page Cavanaugh Trio) (recorded July 25, 1950) - 2:39
"Do Do Do" (George Gershwin, Ira Gershwin) (with Axel Stordahl's orchestra) (recorded July 14, 1950) - 2:11
"I Only Have Eyes For You" (Harry Warren, Al Dubin) (with Axel Stordahl's orchestra) (recorded July 14, 1950) - 3:19
"Oh Me! Oh My! Oh You!" (Vincent Youmans, Ira Gershwin) (duet with Gene Nelson & The Page Cavanaugh Trio) (recorded July 25, 1950) - 2:26
"Tea for Two" (Vincent Youmans, Irving Caesar) (with Axel Stordahl's orchestra) (recorded July 14, 1950) - 3:11

This album, combined with Lullaby of Broadway, was reissued in compact disc form in 2001.

Credits
 Irving Caesar	Composer
 Anne Caldwell	Composer
 Page Cavanaugh	Vocals
 Doris Day	Primary Artist, Vocals
 Al Dubin	Composer
 George Gershwin	Composer
 Ira Gershwin	Composer
 Lorenz Hart	Composer
 Roger Wolfe Kahn	Composer
 Ken Lane	Vocals
 Joseph Meyer	Composer
 Gene Nelson	Vocals
 Richard Rodgers	Composer
 Axel Stordahl	Orchestra Director
 Harry Warren	Composer
 Vincent Youmans	Composer

References

1950 soundtrack albums
Doris Day soundtracks
Columbia Records soundtracks
Albums conducted by Axel Stordahl
Musical film soundtracks